The Battle of Endagabatan was fought in the year 1563 between the forces of the Ethiopian Empire led by Dejazmach Taklo, and rebels under Dejazmach Hamalmal. Hamalmal led a revolt against his cousin, the Emperor of Ethiopia Sarsa Dengel. Hamalmal barricaded his forces at Endagabatan in preparation for an offensive. Largely outnumbered by Hamalmal's rebels, the Emperor's able general Taklo successfully received assistance from the Muslim Malassay Garad Asmaddin of Wej. The revolt was suppressed after a series of victories by the imperial troops which led to Hamalmal requesting clemency from the Emperor.

References

Endagabatan
Endagabatan